The Keewaydin Club is a historic site in Naples, Florida. The Inn, which opened in 1934 and closed in 1999, is located at the north
end of Keewaydin Island. On December 22, 1987, it was added to the U.S. National Register of Historic Places. The Island remained basically natural with no cars or vehicles other than a golf cart at the club on the few southern hundred yards of the 7 mile long island where the rustic but charming club and its guest cottages were located. The island guest strollers would carefully scan the tidal harvest for the daily incoming batch of sea shells, one of the best beaches in Florida for finding many unusual specimens. From mid island, beach walkers could see Marco Island in the distance, highly glitzy and very developed since the 1960s, the opposite of the old pre World War II Florida on untouched and in no way commercialized or developed Keewaydin Island.

Ferry access to the Inn was aboard the Kokomis, a 21-footer now part of the Collier County Museum.

References

External links

 Collier County listings at the National Register of Historic Places
 Florida's Office of Cultural and Historical Programs
 Florida's Office of Cultural and Historical Programs: Collier County listings
 Florida's Office of Cultural and Historical Programs: Keewaydin Club

National Register of Historic Places in Collier County, Florida
Buildings and structures in Naples, Florida
1934 establishments in Florida